Carrollton High School is the high school for the Carrollton Community Unit School District #1, located in Carrollton, Illinois.

History
The current high school was dedicated in 1956.

Athletics
Carrollton High School's athletic teams are known as the Hawks, and field 13 athletic teams (7 boys and 6 girls). They are members of the Western Illinois Valley Conference and compete in the IHSA playoffs. Carrollton won back-to-back girls' basketball state championships in 2000-01 and 2001-02. In 2011 the baseball team won the Class 1A State Championship and finished the season with a school best 31-1-1 record.

Notable alumni
Sam Coonrod, major league pitcher for the Philadelphia Phillies
Sid Simpson, politician

References

External links
District website

C
Greene County, Illinois